Pump Up the Jam (also known as Pump Up the Jam: The Album in North America) is the debut studio album by Belgian dance act Technotronic. It was released on 28 November 1989. The initial album cover and early promotional videos featured a model named Felly, who lip-synched vocals performed by Belgian emcee Ya Kid K. When this was discovered, further videos featured Ya Kid K instead. The album reached number 2 on the UK Albums Chart.

Following the success of the "Move This" single in the USA, the album was reissued in 1992 with Ya Kid K on the cover, billed as Technotronic featuring Ya Kid K, with Felly's name removed from the credits in the booklet.

Track listing 

Notes
Tracks 11 and 12 are CD bonus tracks. Track 12 is titled "Bluestring" on U.S. and Canadian CD release. Tracks 1-4 and 7-10 are longer versions on CD.

Personnel
Manuela "Ya Kid K" Kamosi – vocals
Eric "MC Eric" Martin – vocals
Patrick de Meyer, Yannic Fonderie – keyboards
DJ Seik – turntable scratching on "Get Up!" "Tough," "Take it Slow," and "Raw"
Jo “Thomas de Quincey” Bogaert – all other instruments and programming

Production
Produced by Jo Bogaert for ARS Entertainment Belgium
Engineered by Spencer Henderson at Swanyard Studios, London, UK

Charts

Weekly charts

Year-end charts

Certifications

References

External links
 Personnel And Production Credits. Retrieved 14 April 2010.
 [ Songwriting Credits And Song Lengths.]

1989 debut albums
Technotronic albums
SBK Records albums
Musical hoaxes